A scogger was a Tudor era garment consisting of a sleeve that was worn either on the arm or the lower leg, as required.

A scogger was salvaged from the wreck of the Mary Rose.

References

 Oxford English Dictionary

Parts of clothing